António Morgado (born 28 January 2004) is a Portuguese road cyclist, who currently rides for Bairrada Cycling Team. At the 2022 UCI Road World Championships held in Wollongong, Australia, Morgado won a silver medal in the men's junior road race after he was ousprinted by Emil Herzog at the line. He is due to join  in 2023.

Major results

2021
 National Junior Road Championships
1st  Time trial
2nd Road race
 1st  Overall Volta ao Concelho de Loulé
1st  Points classification
1st  Young rider classification
1st Stage 2
 1st  Overall Ruta do Albariño
1st Prologue (ITT)
 1st  Overall Vuelta al Besaya
1st  Points classification
1st  Young rider classification
1st Stages 3 & 4
 1st  Overall Volta a Portugal Juniores
1st  Points classification
1st  Mountains classification
1st  Young rider classification
1st Stages 1 & 3 (ITT)
 1st Gipuzkoa Klasika
 2nd Overall Bizkaiko Itzulia
1st  Points classification
1st Stages 2 & 4 (ITT)
 2nd Overall Vuelta a Valladolid
 6th Road race, UCI Junior Road World Championships
2022
 National Junior Road Championships
1st  Road race
1st  Time trial
 1st  Overall Volta ao Concelho de Loulé
1st  Points classification
1st  Mountains classification
1st Stage 2 & 3 (TTT)
 1st  Overall Grande Prémio do Minho
1st  Points classification
1st Stage 3
 1st  Overall Ruta do Albariño
1st Prologue (ITT) & Stage 1
 1st  Overall Vuelta al Besaya
1st  Points classification
1st  Mountains classification
1st Stages 1 & 3
 1st  Overall Vuelta a Valladolid
1st Stages 1 & 2 (ITT)
 1st  Overall Vuelta Ribera del Duero
1st Stages 1 & 3
 1st  Overall Volta a Portugal Juniores
1st  Mountains classification
1st Stages 3 (ITT) & 5
 1st  Overall Giro della Lunigiana
1st  Mountains classification
 2nd  Road race, UCI Junior Road World Championships
 2nd Overall Course de la Paix Juniors
1st  Mountains classification
 2nd Overall Gipuzkoa Klasikoa
 2nd Overall Trophée Centre Morbihan
 4th Overall Tour du Pays de Vaud
 9th Time trial, UEC European Junior Road Championships
2023
 1st  Overall International Tour of Rhodes
1st  Young rider classification

References

External links

2004 births
Living people
People from Caldas da Rainha
Portuguese male cyclists
Sportspeople from Leiria District
21st-century Portuguese people